Reshetylivka is a city located in Poltava Raion of Poltava Oblast in central Ukraine, and formerly the administrative center of Reshetylivka Raion. Population: 

History 
It was founded in 1638 as a small village.

Reshetylivka was occupied on September 22, 1941 by the German army.  It was liberated on September 24, 1943.

Demographics 

The population of Reshetylivka as of 2006 was 9,336. The 2007 population is estimated at 9,297.
The annual growth rate is -0.28.

Government 
The Resehtylivka city council (міська рада)consists of 30 members elected by citizens of Reshetylivka. The head of the city council since March 26, 2006 has been Volodumyr Viktorovich Kuzmenko.
The State Treasury of Ukraine District Department is also located in Reshetylivka.

Economy

Agriculture and Food Processing 
Reshetylivka Butter Making Factory, has operated in the settlement since 1924.

Reshetylivka District Consumers Union and the Reshetylivka Inter-Farm Poultry Incubating Enterprise both are collective businesses which have operated since 1936.

Public Catering Enterprises Association of Reshetylivka District Consumer Union has operated in the settlement since 1973.

Banks
PRYVATBANK JSCB, Reshetylivka Branch Office, Aval, Reshetylivka Branch Office, Nadra, Idex Bank, OshchadBank are the banks located in the settlement.

Industrial organizations 
Reshetylivka Motor Transport Enterprise No 153 and Raiavtodor Reshetylivka Branch Office of Affiliate Poltavaoblavtodor  have both operated since 1976.

Reshetylivka Private Art Handicraft Centre which opened in 1903 is also located in the settlement.

Education 
Arts and Crafts School and an Agricultural School operate in the settlement.

References

Villages in Poltava Raion
Poltavsky Uyezd